Pima difficilis is a species of snout moth. It is found in Mozambique.

References

Endemic fauna of Mozambique
Moths described in 1927
Phycitini
Pima (moth)
Lepidoptera of Mozambique
Moths of Sub-Saharan Africa